Maiboli is a Marathi language free to air music channel. owned by Sri Adhikari Brothers Television Network Ltd.

Music Shows
Dhingaana
Coffee Ani Baarich Gaani
Bhau Mast Vajtay
Dumdaar Hits

Former shows
Amrit Manthan - Kirtan Sohala
Bhakticha Teva
Maza Dhyanoba - TV Serial
Aika Dajiba
Sur Tech Chedita
Priteechi Jhul Jhul Gaani
Chandane Shimpit Jashi
Kayada Cha Kaye
Aashram Chalu Aahey
Bakwas 24 Taas
Bas Taamba
Happy Crime Time
Kon Banel Roadpati
Vatrat Vinya
Office Che Show piece
Locha Zala Re Gugle Aala Re
Andheri Nagari Chopat Raja
Baiko Sher Navra Pavsher
Cinemane Pachadla Serialne Zapatla
Satteche Rangeen Patte
Hyala Aapat Tyala Aapat
Bolte Taare
M...M...Marathicha
Maiboli Review
Maiboli Updates

References

Sri Adhikari Brothers Television
Marathi-language television channels
Television channels and stations established in 2013
2013 establishments in Maharashtra
Television stations in Mumbai

Music television channels in India